The Leader is a weekly newspaper published in the Houston Heights, Houston, Texas. It is delivered to residences in the community. In addition to the Houston Heights it is distributed to other northwest Houston communities, including Garden Oaks and Oak Forest.

Anne Sloan, author of Houston Heights, wrote that circa the 1950s The Leader was "floundering". At one point a man with the family name Burge acquired the publication, and according to Sloan Burge "brought" the publication "back to life in 1957." The man's son, Terry Burge, became the owner and publisher of the newspaper, serving in that role from circa 1970 to 2012. In 2012 McElvy Media, LLC, headed by Jonathan McElvy, acquired the publication.

References

External links
 Leader Newspaper

Weekly newspapers published in Texas
Houston Heights
Companies based in Houston
Newspapers published in Houston